Crowley Vale is a rural locality in the Lockyer Valley Region, Queensland, Australia.

History 
In March 1915, the Queensland Government decided to establish a new school at Verdant Vale. Verdant Vale State School opened in 1916. In 1918 it was renamed Crowley Vale State School. The school closed circa 1941.

References 

Lockyer Valley Region
Localities in Queensland